KSOF (98.9 FM "Soft Rock 98.9") is a commercial radio station licensed to Dinuba, California, and serving Fresno and Tulare counties.  It is owned by iHeartMedia, Inc.  KSOF carries an adult contemporary radio format, switching to Christmas music for much of November and December.  Most of the programming is syndicated:  "Valentine in the Morning" comes from co-owned KBIG Los Angeles, afternoon drive time is from John Tesh's "Intelligence for Your Life", and evenings feature the call-in and dedication show "Delilah."  KSOF's studios and offices are located on Shaw Avenue in North Fresno.

KSOF has an effective radiated power (ERP) of 19,000 watts.  The transmitter tower is off Pierce Valley Drive atop Eshom Point, in Badger, California.  KSOF broadcasts in the HD Radio hybrid format; the station's HD2 subchannel plays 1980s music branded as "Lost 80s Hits", which can also be heard on iHeartRadio.

History

On June 5, 1975, the station signed on as KLTA.  It was the FM counterpart of KRDU (1130 AM).

On October 26, 1983, the station changed its call sign to KOJY. On February 12, 1990, the station changed its call letters to KJOI.  Then on October 17, 1997, it switched to the current KSOF.

In the mid-1970s through the early 1990s, the station had an easy listening format. In late 1990, the station switched to a soft adult contemporary format and was named "Lite FM". The station used the "Lite" name until October 1997, when it became "Soft Rock 98.9". In the early 2000s, KSOF moved into a mainstream AC direction.

In October 2008, former Portland, Oregon radio personality Teri Ann Schlesser became the midday DJ, music director and public service director.  Formerly with the Nelson & Terry Show on KRSK, Schlesser replaced Kristen Kelley who moved on to program another radio station.

On the morning of October 27, 2011, morning hosts "Brady and Rose" (Mike Brady and Rose Ortega) were replaced by "Bronson and Christine" (Bob Bronson and Christine Nagy) from New York sister station WLTW.  In 2018, Schlesser moved into the morning drive time shift, the station's only live DJ.

References

External links

Mainstream adult contemporary radio stations in the United States
SOF
Radio stations established in 1970
1970 establishments in California
IHeartMedia radio stations